This is a list of proposed state mergers, including both current and historical proposals originating from sovereign states or organizations. The entities listed below differ from separatist movements in that they would form as a merger or union of two or more existing states, territories, colonies or other regions, becoming either a federation, confederation or other type of unified sovereign state.

Current proposals

Historical

Early modern period

19th century

20th century

21st century

See also
Arab Union
Atlantic Union
Dynastic union
Independence referendum
Irredentism
List of irredentist claims or disputes
Lists of active separatist movements
North American Union
Pan-Latinism
Pan-nationalism
Political union
Supranational union
Turanism
United States of Africa
United States of Europe
URSAL

References

state mergers
National unifications

state mergers